Michael Freeman (born July 13, 1944) is a former American football defensive back. 

Freeman was born in Los Angeles in 1944 and attended Fresno High School in Fresno, California. He played college football at Fresno State and was selected by the Minnesota Vikings in the fourth round (89th overall pick) of the 1968 NFL Draft. He appeared in 37 games for the Atlanta Falcons, six of them as a starter, from 1968 to 1970. He totaled one interception and five fumble recoveries.

References

1943 births
Living people
American football defensive backs
Fresno State Bulldogs football players
Atlanta Falcons players
Players of American football from Los Angeles